Bağdere can refer to:

 Bağdere, Adıyaman
 Bağdere, Elâzığ
 Bağdere, Silvan
 Bagh Daraq